The Brighton Oaks was an American Thoroughbred horse race run at Brighton Beach Race Course in Brighton Beach, Coney Island, New York from 1901  through 1906. A race for three-year-old fillies, it was contested at various distances:
 1 mile : 1902
 1 mile 70 yards : 1903
  miles : 1904
 1 mile, 1 furlong : 1901, 1905–1906

Records
Speed record: (at 1 mile, 1 furlong)
 1:53.60 - Brookdale Nymph (1906)

Most wins by a jockey:
 2 - Winfield O'Connor (1901, 1902)

Most wins by a trainer:
 2 - Julius Bauer (1901, 1902)
 2 - A. Jack Joyner (1904, 1905)

Most wins by an owner:
 2 - Arthur Featherstone (1901, 1902)
 2 - Sydney Paget (1904, 1905)

Winners

References

Brighton Beach Race Course
Discontinued horse races in New York City
Flat horse races for three-year-old fillies
Coney Island
Recurring sporting events established in 1901
Recurring events disestablished in 1906
1901 establishments in New York City
1906 disestablishments in New York (state)